Lake is a town in Newton and Scott counties, Mississippi. The population was 408 at the 2000 census.

Geography
Lake is located at  (32.343228, -89.328193). The town is located mostly within Scott County, with a portion on the east in adjacent Newton County. In the 2000 census, 393 of the town's 408 residents (96.3%) lived in Scott County and 15 (3.7%) in Newton County.

According to the United States Census Bureau, the town has a total area of 1.1 square miles (2.8 km2), all land.

Demographics

2020 census

As of the 2020 United States census, there were 475 people, 172 households, and 139 families residing in the town.

2000 census
As of the census of 2000, there were 408 people, 147 households, and 108 families residing in the town. The population density was 370.2 people per square mile (143.2/km2). There were 159 housing units at an average density of 144.3 per square mile (55.8/km2). The racial makeup of the town was 44.36% White, 55.15% African American, and 0.49% from two or more races.

There were 147 households, of which 33.3% had children under the age of 18 living with them; 46.9% were married couples living together; 22.4% had a female householder with no husband present; and 26.5% were non-families. 24.5% of all households were made up of individuals, and 10.9% had someone living alone who was 65 years of age or older. The average household size was 2.78 and the average family size was 3.31.

In the town, the population was spread out, with 27.0% under the age of 18, 13.2% from 18 to 24, 25.7% from 25 to 44, 20.6% from 45 to 64, and 13.5% who were 65 years of age or older. The median age was 34 years. For every 100 females, there were 86.3 males. For every 100 females age 18 and over, there were 79.5 males.

The median household income of Lake was $28,333, and the median family income was $40,833. Males had a median income of $28,000 versus $16,250 for females. The per capita income for the town was $12,858. About 20.0% of families and 21.6% of the population were below the poverty line, including 32.1% of those under age 18 and 32.6% of those age 65 or over.

Education
The Scott County portion is served by the Scott County School District.

One portion of the city that lies in Newton County is served by the Newton County School District, and another portion in Newton County is in the Newton Municipal School District.

Notable people
 Chuck Gavin, former defensive end for the Denver Broncos
 Randy Houser, country music singer and songwriter
 John Littlejohn, electric blues slide guitarist
 Jim Lyle, former Major League Baseball pitcher

References

Towns in Scott County, Mississippi
Towns in Newton County, Mississippi
Towns in Mississippi